Athanasios Zafeiropoulos (born 12 February 1944) is a Greek wrestler. He competed in the men's freestyle flyweight at the 1964 Summer Olympics.

References

1944 births
Living people
Greek male sport wrestlers
Olympic wrestlers of Greece
Wrestlers at the 1964 Summer Olympics
Place of birth missing (living people)
20th-century Greek people